The Florida Marlins' 2011 season was the 19th season for the Major League Baseball franchise. This was the final year in which the Marlins played their home games at Sun Life Stadium, as well as the final season for the team under the name "Florida Marlins". They failed to make the playoffs for the 8th consecutive season.

Season standings

Record vs. opponents

Regular season

Game log 

|- bgcolor="ffbbbb"
|- align="center" bgcolor="bbffbb"
| 1 || April 1 || Mets || 6–2 || Johnson (1–0) || Pelfrey (0–1) || || 41,237 || 1–0
|- align="center" bgcolor="ffbbbb"
| 2 || April 2 || Mets || 4–6 (10) || Rodríguez (1–0) || Webb (0–1) || Boyer (1) || 32,495  || 1–1
|- align="center" bgcolor="ffbbbb"
| 3 || April 3 || Mets || 2–9 || Dickey (1–0) || Vázquez (0–1) || || 18,936 || 1–2
|- align="center" bgcolor="bbffbb"
| 4 || April 5 || Nationals || 3–2 (10) || Mujica (1–0) || Storen (0–1) || || 10,482 || 2–2
|- align="center" bgcolor="bbffbb"
| 5 || April 6 || Nationals || 7–4 || Sanches (1–0) || Gaudin (0–1) || Núñez (1) || 13,825 || 3–2 
|- align="center" bgcolor="ffbbbb"
| 6 || April 7 || Nationals || 3–5 (11) || Coffey (1–0) || Mujica (1–1) || Burnett (2) || 10,696 || 3–3 
|- align="center" bgcolor="bbffbb"
| 7 || April 8 || @ Astros || 4–3 || Nolasco (1–0) || López (0–1) || Núñez (2) || 41,042 || 4–3
|- align="center" bgcolor="bbffbb"
| 8 || April 9 || @ Astros || 7–5 || Vázquez (1–1) || Abad (1–1) || Núñez (3) || 25,421 || 5–3
|- align="center" bgcolor="ffbbbb"
| 9 || April 10 || @ Astros || 1–7 || Happ (1–1)  || Sánchez (0–1) || || 22,299 || 5–4
|- align="center" bgcolor="ffbbbb"
| 10 || April 12 || @ Braves || 0–5 || Hanson (1–2) || Volstad (0–1) || || 13,865 || 5–5
|- align="center" bgcolor="bbffbb"
| 11 || April 13 || @ Braves || 5–1 || Johnson (2–0) || Hudson (2–1) || || 14,351 || 6–5
|- align="center" bgcolor="bbffbb"
| 12 || April 14 || @ Braves || 6–5 || Sanches (2–0) || O'Flaherty (0–1)  || Núñez (4) || 16,495 || 7–5
|- align="center" bgcolor="bbffbb"
| 13 || April 15 || @ Phillies || 4–3 || Mujica (2–1) || Báez (1–1) || Núñez (5) || 45,667 || 8–5
|- align="center" bgcolor="bbbbbb"
| – || April 16 || @ Phillies  ||colspan=6| Postponed (rain); Makeup: June 15 as part of a doubleheader
|- align="center" bgcolor="ffbbbb"
| 14 || April 17 || @ Phillies || 2–3 || Madson (1–0) || Webb (0–2) || Contreras (3) || 45,716 || 9–5
|- align="center" bgcolor="bbffbb"
| 15 || April 19 || Pirates || 6–0 || Johnson (3–0) || Maholm (0–3) || || 11,118 || 9–6
|- align="center" bgcolor="bbffbb"
| 16 || April 20 || Pirates || 6–0 || Nolasco (2–0) || Morton (2–1) || || 10,112 || 10–6
|- align="center" bgcolor="bbffbb"
| 17 || April 21 || Pirates || 9–5 || Volstad (1–1) || McDonald (0–2) || || 12,308 || 11–6
|- align="center" bgcolor="bbffbb"
| 18 || April 22 || Rockies || 4–1 || Sánchez (1–1) || Chacín (3–1) || || 15,069 || 12–6
|- align="center" bgcolor="ffbbbb"
| 19 || April 23 || Rockies || 1–3 || Hammel (2–1) || Vázquez (1–2) || Street (7) || 35,381 || 12–7
|- align="center" bgcolor="bbffbb"
| 20 || April 24 || Rockies || 6–3 || Dunn (1–0) || Belisle (2–1) || Núñez (6) || 11,442 || 13–7
|- align="center" bgcolor="bbffbb"
| 21 || April 25 || Dodgers || 5–4 || Sanches (3–0) || Broxton (1–1) || || 11,633 || 14–7
|- align="center" bgcolor="bbffbb"
| 22 || April 26 || Dodgers || 4–2 || Volstad (2–1) || Kershaw (2–3) || Núñez (7) || 12,150 || 15–7
|- align="center" bgcolor="ffbbbb"
| 23 || April 27 || Dodgers || 4–5 (10) || Guerrier (2–1) || Sanches (3–1) || Padilla (1) || 16,523 || 15–8
|- align="center" bgcolor="bbffbb"
| 24 || April 29 || @ Reds || 7–6 || Vázquez (2–2) || Wood (1–3) || Núñez (8) || 27,051 || 16–8
|- align="center" bgcolor="ffbbbb"
| 25 || April 30 || @ Reds || 3–4 (10) || Cordero (1–0) || Dunn (1–1) || || 40,286 || 16–9
|-

|- bgcolor="ffbbbb"
|- align="center" bgcolor="bbffbb"
| 26 || May 1 || @ Reds || 9–5 || Nolasco (3–0) || Arroyo (3–3) || Núñez (9) || 26,941 || 17–9
|- align="center" bgcolor="bbffbb"
| 27 || May 2 || @ Cardinals || 6–5 || Mujica (3–1) || Boggs (0–2) || Núñez (10) || 32,635 || 18–9
|- align="center" bgcolor="ffbbbb"
| 28 || May 3 || @ Cardinals || 5–7 || Salas (1–0) || Webb (0–3) || Sánchez (2) || 32,689 || 18–10
|- align="center" bgcolor="bbffbb"
| 29 || May 4 || @ Cardinals || 8–7 || Dunn (2–1) || Sánchez (1–1) || Núñez (11) || 34,324 || 19–10
|- align="center" bgcolor="ffbbbb"
| 30 || May 5 || @ Cardinals || 3–6 || Motte (1–0) || Johnson (3–1) || Sánchez (3) || 38,509 || 19–11
|- align="center" bgcolor="ffbbbb"
| 31 || May 6 || Nationals || 2–3 (10) || Storen (2–1) || Dunn (2–2) || Burnett (4) || 15,325 || 19–12
|- align="center" bgcolor="ffbbbb"
| 32 || May 7 || Nationals || 2–5 || Gorzelanny (2–2) || Volstad (2–2) || Storen (7) || 17,409 || 19–13
|- align="center" bgcolor="bbffbb"
| 33 || May 8 || Nationals || 8–0 || Sánchez (2–1) || Hernández (3–4) || || 10,523 || 20–13
|- align="center" bgcolor="ffbbbb"
| 34 || May 9 || Phillies || 4–6 || Blanton (1–1) || Vázquez (2–3) || Madson (4) || 11,444 || 20–14
|- align="center" bgcolor="bbffbb"
| 35 || May 10 || Phillies || 2–1 || Dunn (3–2) || Halladay (5–2)|| Núñez (12) || 21,955 || 21–14
|- align="center" bgcolor="ffbbbb"
| 36 || May 11 || Phillies || 3–5 || Kendrick (3–2) || Núñez (0–1) || Madson (5) || 18,504 || 21–15
|- align="center" bgcolor="bbffbb"
| 37 || May 13 || @ Nationals || 6–5 (11) || Mujica (4–1) || Broderick (0–1) || Núñez (13) || 19,503 || 22–15
|- align="center" bgcolor="bbffbb"
| 38 || May 14 || @ Nationals || 1–0 || Sánchez (3–1) || Hernández (3–5) || Núñez (14) || 22,497 || 23–15
|- align="center" bgcolor="ffbbbb"
| 39 || May 15 || @ Nationals || 4–8 || Marquis (5–1) || Vázquez (2–4) || || 18,356 || 23–16
|- align="center" bgcolor="bbffbb"
| 40 || May 16 || @ Mets || 2–1 (11)|| Badenhop (1–0) || Igarashi (0–1) || Núñez (15) || 23,721 || 24–16
|- align="center" bgcolor="bbbbbb"
| – || May 17 || @ Mets ||colspan=6| Postponed (rain); Makeup: July 18
|- align="center" bgcolor="ffbbbb"
| 41 || May 18 || Cubs || 5–7 || Samardzija (3–0) || Mujica (4–2) || Mármol (9) || 14,422 || 24–17
|- align="center" bgcolor="ffbbbb"
| 42 || May 19 || Cubs || 1–5 || Coleman (2–3) || Volstad (2–3) || || 16,345 || 24–18
|- align="center" bgcolor="bbffbb"
| 43 || May 20 || Rays || 5–3 || Dunn (4–2) || Peralta (1–3) || Núñez (16) || 18,111 || 25–18
|- align="center" bgcolor="bbffbb"
| 44 || May 21 || Rays || 5–3 || Vázquez (3–4) || Price (5–4) || Núñez (17) || 21,814 || 26–18
|- align="center" bgcolor="ffbbbb"
| 45 || May 22 || Rays || 0–4 || Shields (5–2) || Buente (0–1) || || 15,432 || 26–19
|- align="center" bgcolor="bbffbb"
| 46 || May 24 || @ Giants || 5–1 || Nolasco (4–0) || Cain (3–3) || Núñez (18) || 41,165 || 27–19
|- align="center" bgcolor="bbffbb"
| 47 || May 25 || @ Giants || 7–6 (12) || Webb (1–3) || Mota (2–1) || Badenhop (1) || 41,037 || 28–19
|- align="center" bgcolor="bbffbb"
| 48 || May 26 || @ Giants || 1–0 || Sánchez (4–1) || Vogelsong (3–1) || || 41,472 || 29–19
|- align="center" bgcolor="ffbbbb"
| 49 || May 27 || @ Dodgers || 2–3 || De La Rosa (1–0) || Hensley (0–1) || || 34,407 || 29–20
|- align="center" bgcolor="bbffbb"
| 50 || May 28 || @ Dodgers || 6–1 || Mujica (5–2) || Kuroda (5–5) || || 29,971 || 30–20
|- align="center" bgcolor="ffbbbb"
| 51 || May 29 || @ Dodgers || 0–8 || Kershaw (6–3) || Nolasco (4–1) || || 30,621 || 30–21
|- align="center" bgcolor="ffbbbb"
| 52 || May 30 || @ Diamondbacks || 4–15 || Saunders (2–5) || Volstad (2–4) || || 23,465 || 30–22
|- align="center" bgcolor="bbffbb"
| 53 || May 31 || @ Diamondbacks || 5–2 || Sánchez (5–1) || Kennedy (6–2) || Núñez (19) || 17,571 || 31–22
|-

|- bgcolor="ffbbbb"
|- align="center" bgcolor="ffbbbb"
| 54 || June 1 || @ Diamondbacks || 5–6 || Putz (1–1) || Hensley (0–2) || || 16,169 || 31–23
|- align="center" bgcolor="ffbbbb"
| 55 || June 3 || Brewers || 5–6 || McClendon (3–0) || Núñez (0–2) || Axford (14) || 15,315 || 31–24
|- align="center" bgcolor="ffbbbb"
| 56 || June 4 || Brewers || 2–3 || Gallardo (8–2) || Volstad (2–5) || Axford (15) || 17,204 || 31–25
|- align="center" bgcolor="ffbbbb"
| 57 || June 5 || Brewers || 5–6 (11) || Dillard (1–0) || Dunn (4–3) || Axford (16) || 13,208 || 31–26
|- align="center" bgcolor="ffbbbb"
| 58 || June 6 || Brewers || 2–7 || Greinke (5–1) || Vázquez (3–5) || || 12,404 || 31–27
|- align="center" bgcolor="ffbbbb"
| 59 || June 7 || Braves || 0–1 || Hanson (7–4) || Hand (0–1) || Kimbrel (18) || 13,302 || 31–28
|- align="center" bgcolor="ffbbbb"
| 60 || June 8 || Braves || 2–3 (10) || Kimbrel (2–2) || Dunn (4–4) || Linebrink (1) || 14,626 || 31–29
|- align="center" bgcolor="ffbbbb"
| 61 || June 9 || Braves || 2–3 || Jurrjens (8–2) || Volstad (2–6) || Venters (2) || 16,613 || 31–30
|- align="center" bgcolor="bbffbb"
| 62 || June 10 || Diamondbacks || 6–4 || Sánchez (6–1) || Saunders (3–6) || Cishek (1) || 18,888 || 32–30
|- align="center" bgcolor="ffbbbb"
| 63 || June 11 || Diamondbacks || 5–9 || Kennedy (7–2) || Vázquez (3–6) || || 25,321 || 32–31
|- align="center" bgcolor="ffbbbb"
| 64 || June 12 || Diamondbacks || 1–5 || Hudson (7–5) || Hand (0–2) || || 16,353 || 32–32
|- align="center" bgcolor="ffbbbb"
| 65 || June 13 || Diamondbacks || 9–12 || Owings (3–0) || Nolasco (4–2) || Putz (18) || 15,065 || 32–33
|- align="center" bgcolor="ffbbbb"
| 66 || June 14 || @ Phillies || 1–9 || Hamels (9–2) || Volstad (2–7) || || 45,424 || 32–34
|- align="center" bgcolor="ffbbbb"
| 67 || June 15 || @ Phillies || 1–8 || Kendrick (4–4) || Villanueva (0–1) || || 44,758 || 32–35
|- align="center" bgcolor="ffbbbb"
| 68 || June 15 || @ Phillies || 4–5 (10) || Madson (3–1) || Dunn (4–5) || || 45,880 || 32–36
|- align="center" bgcolor="ffbbbb"
| 69 || June 16 || @ Phillies || 0–3 || Lee (7–5) || Vázquez (3–7) || || 45,628 || 32–37
|- align="center" bgcolor="ffbbbb"
| 70 || June 17 || @ Rays || 1–5 || Davis (6–5) || Hand (0–3) || Farnsworth (15) || 15,708 || 32–38
|- align="center" bgcolor="ffbbbb"
| 71 || June 18 || @ Rays || 4–7 || Cobb (2–0) || Nolasco (4–3) || || 20,495 || 32–39
|- align="center" bgcolor="ffbbbb"
| 72 || June 19 || @ Rays || 1–2 || Shields (7–4) || Webb (1–4) || || 26,761 || 32–40
|- align="center" bgcolor="ffbbbb"
| 73 || June 20 || Angels || 1–2 || Weaver (9–4) || Cishek (0–1) || Walden (17) || 16,984 || 32–41
|- align="center" bgcolor="bbffbb"
| 74 || June 21 || Angels || 5–2 || Vázquez (4–7) || Santana (3–8) || Núñez (20) || 17,344 || 33–41
|- align="center" bgcolor="ffbbbb"
| 75 || June 22 || Angels || 5–6 (10)|| Walden (1–1) || Badenhop (1–1) || Kohn (1) || 19,721 || 33–42
|- align="center" bgcolor="ffbbbb"
| 76* || June 24 || Mariners || 1–5 || Hernández (8–6) || Nolasco (4–4) || || 15,279 || 33–43
|- align="center" bgcolor="bbffbb"
| 77* || June 25 || Mariners || 4–2 || Volstad (3–7) || Vargas (5–5) || Núñez (21) || 16,896 || 34–43
|- align="center" bgcolor="ffbbbb"
| 78* || June 26 || Mariners || 1–2 (10) || Pauley (5–1) || Choate (0–1) || League (21) || 10,925 || 34–44
|- align="center" bgcolor="ffbbbb"
| 79 || June 28 || @ Athletics || 0–1 || Gonzalez (7–5) || Vázquez (4–8) || Bailey (6) || 12,124 || 34–45
|- align="center" bgcolor="bbffbb"
| 80 || June 29 || @ Athletics || 3–0 || Nolasco (5–4) || Moscoso (2–4)|| || 17,006 || 35–45  
|- align="center" bgcolor="bbffbb"
| 81 || June 30 || @ Athletics || 5–4 || Volstad (4–7) || Cahill (8–6) || Núñez (22) || 18,395 || 36–45
|-
| colspan=11 align="center"|*=Played at Safeco Field in Seattle, Washington.
|-

|- bgcolor="ffbbbb"
|- align="center" bgcolor="ffbbbb"
| 82 || July 1 || @ Rangers || 5–15 || Ogando (8–3) || Sánchez (6–2) || || 32,474 || 36–46
|- align="center" bgcolor="bbffbb"
| 83 || July 2 || @ Rangers || 9–5 || Cishek (1–1) || Holland (6–4) || || 29,728 || 37–46
|- align="center" bgcolor="bbffbb"
| 84 || July 3 || @ Rangers || 6–4 || Dunn (5–5) || Lowe (2–2) || Núñez (23) || 46,092 || 38–46
|- align="center" bgcolor="ffbbbb"
| 85 || July 4 || Phillies || 0–1 || Worley (4–1) || Nolasco (5–5) || Bastardo (5) || 27,103 || 38–47
|- align="center" bgcolor="ffbbbb"
| 86 || July 5 || Phillies || 2–14 || Hamels (10–4) || Volstad (4–8) || || 17,333 || 38–48 
|- align="center" bgcolor="bbffbb"
| 87 || July 6 || Phillies ||7–6 (10) || Mujica (6–2) || Báez (2–4) || || 16,123 || 39–48
|- align="center" bgcolor="bbffbb"
| 88 || July 7 || Astros ||5–0 || Hand (1–3) || Happ (3–11) || || 17,044 || 40–48 
|- align="center" bgcolor="bbffbb"
| 89 || July 8 || Astros ||6–3 || Vázquez (5–8) || Lyles (0–4) || Núñez (24) || 17,044 || 41–48
|- align="center" bgcolor="bbffbb"
| 90 || July 9 || Astros || 6–1 || Nolasco (6–5)||Myers (3–9) || || 20,402 || 42–48
|- align="center" bgcolor="bbffbb"
| 91 || July 10 || Astros || 5–4 || Volstad (5–8) || W. Rodríguez (6–6)|| Núñez (25) || 17,123 || 43–48
|- align="center" bgcolor="bbffbb"
| 92 || July 14 || @ Cubs || 6–3 || Mujica (7–2) || Mármol (2–3) || || 38,145 || 44–48
|- align="center" bgcolor="ffbbbb"
| 93 || July 15 || @ Cubs || 1–2 || Dempster (7–6) || Nolasco (6–6) || Marshall (2) || 38,391 || 44–49
|- align="center" bgcolor="bbffbb"
| 94 || July 16 || @ Cubs || 13–3 || Vázquez (6–8) || Zambrano (6–5) || || 40,709 || 45–49
|- align="center" bgcolor="bbffbb"
| 95 || July 17 || @ Cubs || 7–5 || Mujica (8–2) || Wood (1–5) || Núñez (26) || 37,634 || 46–49
|- align="center" bgcolor="bbffbb"
| 96 || July 18 || @ Mets || 4–1 || Hensley (1–2) || Capuano (8–9) || Núñez (27) || 32,411 || 47–49
|- align="center" bgcolor="ffbbbb"
| 97 || July 19 || Padres || 0–4 || Stauffer (6–6) || Sánchez (6–3) || Bell (27) || 17,101 || 47–50
|- align="center" bgcolor="ffbbbb"
| 98 || July 20 || Padres || 3–14 || Harang (8–2) || Nolasco (6–7) || || 19,142 || 47–51
|- align="center" bgcolor="ffbbbb"
| 99 || July 21 || Padres || 3–5 || Moseley (3–9) || Vázquez (6–9) || Bell (28) || 27,143 || 47–52
|- align="center" bgcolor="ffbbbb"
| 100 || July 22 || Mets || 6–7 || Parnell (3–1)|| Mujica (8–3)  ||Isringhausen (2)|| 21,304 || 47–53
|- align="center" bgcolor="bbffbb"
| 101 || July 23 || Mets || 8–5 || Badenhop (2–1) || Capuano (8–10)|| ||26,345 || 48–53
|- align="center" bgcolor="bbffbb"
| 102 || July 24 || Mets ||  5–4 || Choate (1–1) || Parnell (3–2) || Núñez (28) || 20,416 || 49–53
|- align="center" bgcolor="bbffbb"
| 103 || July 26 || @ Nationals || 11–2 || Nolasco (7–7) || Zimmermann (6–9) || || 24,650 || 50–53
|- align="center" bgcolor="bbffbb"
| 104 || July 27 || @ Nationals || 7–5 || Vázquez(7–9) || Hernández (5–10) || Núñez (29) || 21,974 || 51–53
|- align="center" bgcolor="bbffbb"
| 105 || July 28 || @ Nationals || 5–2 || Sanches (4–1) || Lannan (7–7) || || 24,153 || 52–53
|- align="center" bgcolor="ffbbbb"
| 106 || July 29 || @ Braves || 0–5 || Beachy (4–2) || Hensley (1–3) || || 36,063 || 52–54
|- align="center" bgcolor="ffbbbb"
| 107 || July 30 || @ Braves || 1–5 || Hudson (10–7) || Sánchez(6–4) || || 40,656 || 52–55
|- align="center" bgcolor="bbffbb"
| 108 || July 31 || @ Braves || 3–1 || Nolasco (8–7) || Hanson (11–6) || Núñez (30) || 23,085 || 53–55
|-

|- bgcolor="ffbbbb"
|- align="center" bgcolor="bbffbb"
| 109 || August 1 || @ Mets || 7–3 (10) || Núñez (1–2) || Isringhausen (2–1) || || 28,862 || 54–55
|- align="center" bgcolor="bbffbb"
| 110 || August 2 || @ Mets || 4–3 || Cishek (2–1) || Isringhausen (2–2) || Núñez (31) || 33,297 || 55–55
|- align="center" bgcolor="bbbbbb"
| – || August 3 || @ Mets ||colspan=6| Postponed (rain); Makeup: August 29 as part of a doubleheader
|- align="center" bgcolor="ffbbbb"
| 111 || August 4 || Cardinals || 4–7 || McClellan (9–6) || Hensley (1–4) || Salas (20) || 20,011 || 55–56
|- align="center" bgcolor="ffbbbb"
| 112 || August 5 || Cardinals || 2–3 || Boggs (1–3) || Sánchez(6–5) || Lynn (1) || 19,303 || 55–57
|- align="center" bgcolor="ffbbbb"
| 113 || August 6 || Cardinals || 1–2 || Carpenter (7–8) || Nolasco (8–8) || Salas (21) || 23,922 || 55–58
|- align="center" bgcolor="ffbbbb"
| 114 || August 7 || Cardinals || 4–8 || Boggs (2–3) || Dunn (5–6) || || 20,011 || 55–59
|- align="center" bgcolor="ffbbbb"
| 115 || August 8 || Braves || 5–8 || Lowe (7–10) || Hand (1–4) || Kimbrel (35) || 20,330 || 55–60
|- align="center" bgcolor="ffbbbb"
| 116 || August 9 || Braves || 3–4 (11) || Sherrill (3–1) || Mujica (8–4) || Kimbrel (36) || 21,337 || 55–61
|- align="center" bgcolor="ffbbbb"
| 117 || August 10 || Braves || 2–6 || Hudson (12–7) || Sánchez (6–6) || Venters (4) || 22,104 || 55–62
|- align="center" bgcolor="bbffbb"
| 118 || August 12 || Giants || 2–1 || Nolasco (9–8) || Cain (9–9) || Núñez (32) || 22,431 || 56–62
|- align="center" bgcolor="ffbbbb"
| 119 || August 13 || Giants || 0–3 || Lincecum (11–9) || Vázquez(7–10) || Wilson (35) || 25,013 || 56–63
|- align="center" bgcolor="ffbbbb"
| 120 || August 14 || Giants || 2–5 || Vogelsong (10–2) || Volstad (5–9) || Ramírez (2) || 20,020 || 56–64
|- align="center" bgcolor="ffbbbb"
| 121 || August 15 || @ Rockies || 4–7 || Belisle (7–4) || Núñez (1–3) || || 32,175 || 56–65
|- align="center" bgcolor="bbffbb"
| 122 || August 16 || @ Rockies || 6–5 || Sánchez (7–6) || Chacín (9–10) || Núñez (33) || 36,136 || 57–65
|- align="center" bgcolor="ffbbbb"
| 123 || August 17 || @ Rockies || 5–12 || Chacín (9–10) || Nolasco (9–9) || || 33,522 || 57–66
|- align="center" bgcolor="ffbbbb"
| 124 || August 18 || @ Padres || 1–3 || Stauffer (8–9) || Vázquez(7–11) || Bell (33) || 18,403 || 57–67
|- align="center" bgcolor="ffbbbb"
| 125 || August 19 || @ Padres || 3–4 || LeBlanc (2–2) || Volstad (5–10) || Bell (34) || 26,065 || 57–68
|- align="center" bgcolor="ffbbbb"
| 126 || August 20 || @ Padres || 1–14 || Harang (12–3) || Hensley (1–5) || || 37,268 || 57–69
|- align="center" bgcolor="ffbbbb"
| 127 || August 21 || @ Padres || 3–4 || Bell (3–4) || Mujica (8–5) || || 40,065 || 57–70
|- align="center" bgcolor="ffbbbb"
| 128 || August 23 || Reds || 6–8 || Chapman (3–1) || Núñez (1–4) || Cordero (27) || 21,204 || 57–71
|- align="center" bgcolor="bbffbb"
| 129 || August 24 || Reds || 6–5 || Webb (2–4) || Arredondo (3–4) || Cishek (2) || N/A || 58–71
|- align="center" bgcolor="ffbbbb"
| 130 || August 24 || Reds || 2–3 || Arroyo (8–10) || Volstad (5–11) || Cordero (28) || 22,505 || 58–72
|- align="center" bgcolor="bbbbbb"
| – || August 25 || Reds ||colspan=6| Postponed; Played on 8/24
|- align="center" bgcolor="bbffbb"
| 131 || August 26 || @ Phillies || 6–5 || Hensley (1–5) || Oswalt (6–8) || Cishek (3) || 45,523 || 59–72
|- align="center" bgcolor="bbbbbb"
| – || August 27 || @ Phillies ||colspan=6| Postponed (Hurricane Irene); Makeup: September 15 as part of a doubleheader
|- align="center" bgcolor="bbbbbb"
| – || August 28 || @ Phillies ||colspan=6| Postponed (Hurricane Irene); Makeup: September 15 as part of a doubleheader
|- align="center" bgcolor="ffbbbb"
| 132 || August 29 || @ Mets || 1–2 || Dickey (6–11) || Sánchez (7–7) || Parnell (2) || N/A || 59–73
|- align="center" bgcolor="ffbbbb"
| 133 || August 29 || @ Mets || 1–5 || Gee (12–5) || Nolasco (9–10) || || 29,335 || 59–74
|- align="center" bgcolor="bbffbb"
| 134 || August 30 || @ Mets || 6–0 || Vázquez (8–11) || Pelfrey (7–11) || || 30,806 || 60–74
|- align="center" bgcolor="ffbbbb"
| 135 || August 31 || @ Mets || 2–3 || Acosta (2–1) || Volstad (5–12) || Parnell (3) || 27,905 || 60–75
|-

|- bgcolor="ffbbbb"
|- align="center" bgcolor="ffbbbb"
| 136 || September 1 || @ Mets || 5–7 || Batista (4–2) || Hensley (2–6) || Parnell (4) || 27,562 || 60–76
|- align="center" bgcolor="ffbbbb"
| 137 || September 2 || Phillies || 3–5 || Oswalt (7–8) || Hand (1–5) || Madson (27) || 21,659 || 60–77
|- align="center" bgcolor="bbffbb"
| 138 || September 3 || Phillies || 8–4 || Mujica (9–5) || Bastardo (6–1) || || 25,333 || 61–77
|- align="center" bgcolor="bbffbb"
| 139 || September 4 || Phillies || 5–4 (14) || Hensley (3–6) || Herndon (1–3) || || 21,234 || 62–77
|- align="center" bgcolor="bbffbb"
| 140 || September 5 || Mets || 9–3 || Vázquez (9–11) || Capuano (10–12) || || 21,112 || 63–77
|- align="center" bgcolor="ffbbbb"
| 141 || September 6 || Mets || 4–7 (12) || Igarashi (4–1) || Ceda (0–1) || Stinson (1) || 22,318 || 63–78
|- align="center" bgcolor="ffbbbb"
| 142 || September 7 || Mets || 0–1 || Dickey (8–11) || Hand (1–6) || Acosta (1) || 21,303 || 63–79
|- align="center" bgcolor="bbffbb"
| 143 || September 9 || @ Pirates || 13–4 || Nolasco (10–10) || Ohlendorf (0–2) || || 24,527 || 64–79
|- align="center" bgcolor="bbffbb"
| 144 || September 10 || @ Pirates || 3–0 || Sánchez (8–7) || Locke (0–1) || || 34,063 || 65–79
|- align="center" bgcolor="bbffbb"
| 145 || September 11 || @ Pirates || 4–1 || Vázquez (10–11) || McDonald (9–8) || Núñez (34) || 19,071 || 66–79
|- align="center" bgcolor="bbffbb"
| 146 || September 12 || @ Braves || 5–4 (12) || Hensley (4–6) || Varvaro (0–2) || Núñez (35) || 17,216 || 67–79
|- align="center" bgcolor="ffbbbb"
| 147 || September 13 || @ Braves || 1–7 || Moylan (2–1) || Hand (1–7) || || 22,707 || 67–80
|- align="center" bgcolor="ffbbbb"
| 148 || September 14 || @ Braves || 1–4 || O'Flaherty (2–4) || Nolasco (10–11) || Kimbrel (44) || 22,245 || 67–81
|- align="center" bgcolor="ffbbbb"
| 149 || September 15 || @ Phillies || 1–3 || Kendrick (8–6) || Sánchez (8–8) || Madson (31) || 44,216 || 67–82
|- align="center" bgcolor="ffbbbb"
| 150 || September 15 || @ Phillies || 1–2 (10) || Schwimer (1–0) || Badenhop (2–2) || || 44,950 || 67–83
|- align="center" bgcolor="bbffbb"
| 151 || September 16 || @ Nationals || 3–0 || Vázquez (11–11) || Lannan (9–13) || || 22,932 || 68–83
|- align="center" bgcolor="bbffbb"
| 152 || September 17 || @ Nationals || 4–1 (13) || Hensley (5–6) || Balester (1–4) || Núñez (36) || 33,247 || 69–83
|- align="center" bgcolor="ffbbbb"
| 153 || September 18 || @ Nationals || 3–4 || Wang (3–3) || Hand (1–8) || Storen (38) || 26,581 || 69–84
|- align="center" bgcolor="bbffbb"
| 154 || September 19 || Braves || 6–5 || Hensley (6–6) || Kimbrel (4–3) || || 21,640 || 70–84
|- align="center" bgcolor="ffbbbb"
| 155 || September 20 || Braves || 0–4 || Delgado (1–1) || Sánchez (8–9) || || 21,733 || 70–85
|- align="center" bgcolor="bbffbb"
| 156 || September 21 || Braves || 4–0 || Vázquez (12–11) || Lowe (9–16) || || 22,240 || 71–85
|- align="center" bgcolor="ffbbbb"
| 157 || September 23 || @ Brewers || 1–4 || Rodríguez (6–2) || Hensley (6–7) || Axford (44) || 44,584 || 71–86
|- align="center" bgcolor="ffbbbb"
| 158 || September 24 || @ Brewers || 4–6 || Hawkins (2–1) || Badenhop (2–3) || Axford (45) || 44,520 || 71–87
|- align="center" bgcolor="ffbbbb"
| 159 || September 25 || @ Brewers || 5–9 || Narveson (11–8) || Nolasco (10–12) || || 43,347 || 71–88
|- align="center" bgcolor="ffbbbb"
| 160 || September 26 || Nationals || 4–6 || Severino (1–0) || Mujica (9–6) || Rodriguez (2) || 21,058 || 71–89
|- align="center" bgcolor="bbffbb"
| 161 || September 27 || Nationals || 3–2 || Vázquez (13–11) || Slaten (0–2) || || 21,902 || 72–89
|- align="center" bgcolor="ffbbbb"
| 162 || September 28 || Nationals || 1–3 || Strasburg (1–1) || Volstad (5–13) || Storen (43) || 34,615 || 72–90
|-

Roster

Player stats

Batting
Note: G = Games played; AB = At bats; R = Runs scored; H = Hits; 2B = Doubles; 3B = Triples; HR = Home runs; RBI = Runs batted in; AVG = Batting average; SB = Stolen bases

Pitching
Note: W = Wins; L = Losses; ERA = Earned run average; G = Games pitched; GS = Games started; SV = Saves; IP = Innings pitched; H = Hits allowed; R = Runs allowed; ER = Earned runs allowed; BB = Walks allowed; K = Strikeouts

Farm system

LEAGUE CHAMPIONS: Greensboro

References

External links
2011 Florida Marlins season Official Site
2011 Florida Marlins season at Baseball Reference
2011 Florida Marlins season at ESPN

Miami Marlins seasons
Florida Marlins season
Miami